Wellington Suburbs and Country is a former parliamentary electorate in Wellington, New Zealand, from 1911 to 1919. The electorate was combined from Wellington Suburbs and Wellington Country electorates.

Population centres
In the 1911 electoral redistribution, the North Island gained a further seat from the South Island due to faster population growth. In addition, there were substantial population movements within each island, and significant changes resulted from this. Only four electorates were unaltered, five electorates were abolished, one former electorate was re-established, and four electorates, including Wellington Suburbs and Country, were created for the first time.

Settlements that had been covered by the Wellington Suburbs electorate include Miramar Peninsula, Mākara, Mākara Beach, Johnsonville, Ohariu Valley, and Tawa. All these were also included in the Wellington Suburbs and Country electorate, and settlements that were gained included Haywards (from the Hutt electorate), and Judgeford, Pāuatahanui, Titahi Bay, and Pukerua Bay (all from the  electorate).

This and the transfer to an electorate with which they had "no community of interest whatever" led to objections to the transfer from the Pāuatahanui area to their former Otaki MP William Field ("a man interested in farming") and to the Prime Minister Sir Joseph Ward, to no avail. The area had five hotels serving the Cobb & Co coaches which went north through the settlement, and their bars were closed.

In the 1918 electoral redistribution, the Wellington Suburbs and Country electorate was abolished again, and its area split between the Wellington Suburbs and the Otaki electorates.

History
The Wellington Suburbs and Country electorate was represented by two Members of Parliament.

Members of Parliament
Key

Election results

Notes

References

 

Historical electorates of New Zealand
Politics of the Wellington Region
1911 establishments in New Zealand
1919 disestablishments in New Zealand